La Paz Municipality is the capital municipality (sección municipal capital) and one of the five municipalities of the Pedro Domingo Murillo Province in the  La Paz Department in  Bolivia. Its seat is La Paz.

Geography 
The Cordillera Real traverses the province. Some of the highest peaks of the municipality are listed below:

Places of interest 
Some of the tourist attractions of the municipality are:
 Wayna Potosí, a mountain about 15 km north west of La Paz
 Qutapata National Park and Integrated Management Natural Area
 Abra de la Cumbre at a height of 4,650 m above sea level, the highest point on the route between La Paz and the Yungas
 K'ili K'ili viewpoint which presents a panoramic view of the city of La Paz
 Muela del Diablo ("Devil's Tooth"), a giant rock of about 150 m height that has the shape of a tooth
 Valle de la Luna ("Moon Valley"), south of La Paz city
 La Paz zoo "Vesty Pakos Sofra" with an area of 22.4 ha, the largest zoo in Bolivia, the second largest in South America and the highest in the world.
 Inkachaka Dam

See also 
 Laram Quta
 Sirk'i Quta

References 

 www.ine.gov.bo / census 2001: La Paz Municipality

External links 
 La Paz Municipality: population data and map

Municipalities of La Paz Department (Bolivia)